Ange-Marie Filippi-Codaccioni (1925 - July 12, 2018) was a French historian and Communist politician. He was the author of several history books, and the deputy mayor of Aulnay-sous-Bois from 1971 to 1977.

Early life
Filippi-Codaccioni was born in 1925. His parents were schoolteachers.

Filippi-Codaccioni graduated from the University of Algiers, where he earned a bachelor's degree in 1948. He studied at the Sorbonne and earned the CAPES, followed by the agrégation in History.

Career
Filippi-Codaccioni began his career as a teaching assistant at the Lycée Carnot in Paris. He taught History in Saint-Omer from 1953 to 1957, in Ajaccio from 1957 to 1967, followed by Bondy, and finally at the Collège-lycée Jacques-Decour in Paris. He retired from teaching in 1986, and authored three textbooks.

Filippi-Codaccioni was a member of the French Communist Party in 1943. He served on the committee of the Communist Federation of Corsica from 1957 to 1967. He ran for mayor of Ajaccio in 1965, and for the National Assembly in 1967, but lost both times. He was the deputy mayor of Aulnay-sous-Bois from 1971 to 1977. He authored a book about Communism, and he was the editor-in-chief of L'École et la Nation, an education magazine published by the French Communist Party.

Personal life and death
Filippi-Codaccioni had a wife. He died on July 12, 2018 in Ajaccio, Corsica, France.

Selected works

Textbooks

Politics

References

1925 births
2018 deaths
Writers from Ajaccio
University of Algiers alumni
Paris-Sorbonne University alumni
20th-century French historians
French Communist Party politicians
Place of birth missing
Politicians from Ajaccio